"Thought I Was Dreaming" is a song recorded by Canadian country music artist Lawnie Wallace. It was released in 1996 as the second single from her debut album, Thought I Was Dreaming. It peaked at number 8 on the RPM Country Tracks chart in June 1996.

Chart performance

Year-end charts

References

1996 songs
1996 singles
Lawnie Wallace songs
MCA Records singles
Songs written by Steve Earle